Boris Aleksandrovich Vorontsov-Velyaminov (February 14, 1904 – January 27, 1994) was a Russian astrophysicist. His name is sometimes given as Vorontsov-Vel'yaminov.

He independently discovered the absorption of light by interstellar dust, which was also discovered by Robert Julius Trumpler.  He compiled a catalogue of what are now known as Vorontsov-Velyaminov galaxies (the Atlas of Interacting Galaxies), as well as a larger and more general catalogue of galaxies (the Morphological Catalogue of Galaxies).  He also studied and classified planetary nebulae. He is also the author of the standard Russian astronomy textbook for high schools as well as astronomy textbook for secondary school.

See also 
Vorontsov-Vel'yaminov Interacting Galaxies

References

Literatur von und über Boris Alexandrowitsch Woronzow-Weljaminow im Katalog der Deutschen Nationalbibliothek

External links
The Catalogue of Interacting Galaxies by Vorontsov-Velyaminov

1904 births
1994 deaths
Soviet astronomers